The Diary of a Worker (and also released as Not by Bread Alone) is a 1967 Finnish drama film directed by Risto Jarva. It was entered into the 5th Moscow International Film Festival.

Cast
 Elina Salo as Ritva Vehoniemi
 Paul Osipow as Juhani Vehoniemi
 Titta Karakorpi as Laura
 Pentti Irjala as Ritva's uncle
 Matti Ruohola as Erik
 Heikki Hämäläinen as Matti
 Irma Seikkula as Hilda - uncle's wife
 Pertti Lumirae as Raimo
 Marja Korhonen as Ritva's boss
 Kullervo Kalske as Foreman in Helsinki
 Ritva Holmberg as Matti's wife
 Richard Ahlqvist as Karl
 Markku Salo as Juhani's Father
 Aino Lehtimäki as Ritva's Mother

References

External links
 

1967 films
1967 drama films
Finnish drama films
1960s Finnish-language films
Finnish black-and-white films